Matthew Jonathan Jukes  is a senior British police officer who is currently (since September, 2021) serving as an Assistant Commissioner for Specialist Operations within the Metropolitan Police Service. He previously served as Chief Constable of South Wales Police.

Career
He graduated with a BA in Mathematics from St Peter's College, Oxford in 1995, and shortly afterwards joined South Yorkshire Police as a PC. He worked as a detective and in other roles from 1997 to 2006, including representing UK policing at G8 meetings and time with the precursor of the National Counter Terrorism Policing Network, and was also praised for his conduct during the Rotherham child sexual exploitation scandal.

He first moved to South Wales Police in 2010 as an Assistant Chief Constable, rising to become its Chief Constable in January 2018, also being awarded a Queen's Police Medal in the New Year Honours that year. Jukes was awarded an Honorary Fellowship by Cardiff University for achieving international distinction. In November 2020 he moved to the Metropolitan Police Service (MPS) as an Assistant Commissioner, succeeding Mark Simmons and initially with a remit for the MPS's transformation programme.

Honours

References 

British Chief Constables
English recipients of the Queen's Police Medal
Assistant Commissioners of Police of the Metropolis
Living people
Alumni of St Peter's College, Oxford
20th-century births
Year of birth missing (living people)